Alexandre Haldemann (born 8 March 1995) is a Swiss swimmer. He competed in the men's 200 metre freestyle event at the 2016 Summer Olympics.

References

External links
 

1995 births
Living people
Olympic swimmers of Switzerland
Swimmers at the 2016 Summer Olympics
Place of birth missing (living people)
Swiss male freestyle swimmers
Sportspeople from the canton of Geneva
21st-century Swiss people